Vojkovce is a village and municipality in the Spišská Nová Ves District in the Košice Region of eastern Slovakia. It lies in the eastern part of Spišská Nová Ves District. In 2011 it had 443 inhabitants. The mayor is Rastislav Kolej.

References

External links
http://en.e-obce.sk/obec/vojkovce/vojkovce.html
Official homepage

Villages and municipalities in Spišská Nová Ves District